Hayate (write: 疾風 lit. "Hurricane") may refer to:

 Hayate (train), the name of a train service in Japan
 Nakajima Ki-84, a World War II era fighter
 Japanese destroyer Hayate, two destroyers built for the Imperial Japanese Navy
 Forward Racing formerly Hayate Racing Team, the Kawasaki team in the 2009 MotoGP season

People with the given name
, Japanese footballer
, Japanese swimmer. 
, Japanese footballer 
, Japanese footballer
, Japanese footballer
, Japanese footballer
, Japanese footballer
, Japanese footballer
, Japanese footballer
, Japanese professional mixed martial artist

Fictional characters 
 Hayate Ayasaki, the main character in the anime series Hayate the Combat Butler
 Hayate (Dead or Alive), a fighter in the Dead or Alive video game series
 Hayate, a character in Street Fighter EX2
 Black Hayate, a dog in Fullmetal Alchemist
 Hayate Gekko, the examiner for the preliminaries of the Chuunin Exams in Naruto
 Hayate Kirino, a character in Igano Kabamaru
 Hayate Nakajima, a character from the second Strike Witches manga
 Hayate Yagami, a character in Magical Girl Lyrical Nanoha As anime and its sequel
 Sho Hayate, the main character in the Fu'un video game series
 Hayate, lead male character in Prétear
 Hayate Immelmann, the protagonist in the anime series Macross Delta
 Hayate, an archer in the MOBA game Arena of Valor

See also
 Hayate the Combat Butler, a Japanese manga series
 Hayate X Blade, a Japanese manga series
 Ninja Hayate, a 1984 laserdisc arcade game by Taito

Japanese unisex given names